Joe Danger Infinity is an endless runner developed and published by British indie studio Hello Games. It was released for iOS devices on 9 January 2014.

Reception

The game received "favourable" reviews according to the review aggregation website Metacritic.

Digital Spy gave it all five stars, saying that it "doesn't take the series to new heights, but the old daredevil still has plenty of life left in him." Metro gave the game a score of eight out of ten, calling it "The best Joe Danger yet, with some fun new gimmick and some of the best touchscreen controls ever seen in an action game." However, National Post gave it seven out of ten, saying, "Worth keeping in mind for series n00bs: I've found Joe Danger games play a bit better on an iPhone or even an iPad Mini than an iPad."

References

External links
 
 

2014 video games
Endless runner games
IOS games
IOS-only games
Platform games
Video game sequels
Video games developed in the United Kingdom